Europe Basketball Academy (often referred to as EBA) is a sports organization  founded in 2010 based in the prestigious coastal living area of  Vilanova i la Geltrú, Province of Barcelona, Spain. EBA focuses on training young semi-professional and professional athletes and preparing them for either prospective careers in one of the European professional leagues or studying and playing for American NCAA college basketball programs and then move onto a professional NBA career.

Notable lecturers
 
Since its establishment in 2010, EBA has hosted many renowned basketball authorities. Some of them are:

 Zan Tabak, head coach at Maccabi FOX Tel Aviv
 Sito Alonso, head coach at Baskonia
 Hakan Demir, former head coach at Trabzonspor B.K.
 Andrea Mazzon, assistant coach at Delaware 87ers
 Zoran Savic, former manager at F.C. Barcelona Bàsquet, founder of Invictus Sports Group
 Joe Arlauckas former professional basketball legendary player of Real Madrid
 Manel Bosch, former Spanish professional basketball player
 Rafael Jofresa, former Spanish professional basketball player
 Antonis Constantinides, head coach at CS Energia
 AJ Mitnick, assistant Coach at Bnei Herzliya
 Christophoros Livadiotes, head coach at ETHA Engomis
 Panayiotis Yiannaras, head coach of Apoel, Cyprus
 Dejan Kamenjasevic, former assistant coach at Caja Laboral
 Zoran Helbich, a Croatian professional basketball player
 Dan Muller, head coach at Illinois State Redbirds (NCAA D-I)
 Dave Rose, head coach at BYU Cougars men's basketball (NCAA D-I)
 Tim Miles, head coach at University of Nebraska (NCAA D-I)
 Darryl Middleton, assistant coach at CSKA Moscow
 Parvaud Bertand, assistant coach at Limogues CSP
 Stefanos Dedas, assistant coach at Royal Halı Gaziantep
 Carles Duran, head coach at Joventut Badalona
 Joan Plaza, head coach at Real Betis
 Porfirio Fisaac, head coach at Zaragoza
 Jota Cuspinera, head coach at Estudiantes
 Nestor Garcia, head coach at Argentina National Team

History
Europe Basketball Academy was founded on March 9, 2010, by Srdjan Premovic, a professional basketball coach from Serbia (born on November 16, 1978, in Obrenovac). Before relocating to Vilanova i la Geltrú in March 2015, EBA was operating in Sant Cugat del Valles and Girona, Spain.

Basketball organizations
2010 establishments in Spain
Basketball in Spain